FAM47E-STBD1 readthrough is a protein that in humans is encoded by the FAM47E-STBD1 gene.

Function 

This locus represents naturally occurring read-through transcription between the neighboring FAM47E (family with sequence similarity 47, member E) and STBD1 (starch binding domain 1) genes on chromosome 4. The read-through transcript encodes a protein that shares sequence identity with the upstream gene product but its C-terminal region is distinct due to frameshifts relative to the downstream gene.

References

Further reading 

 
 

Genes on human chromosome 4